Lot 10 is a township in Prince County, Prince Edward Island, Canada. It is part of Halifax Parish. Lot 10 was awarded to Simon Luttrell, 1st Earl of Carhampton in the 1767 land lottery. Ownership passed to John Motteux, High Sheriff of Norfolk by 1783, and to the Earl of Selkirk by 1806.

Communities

Incorporated municipalities:

 Lady Slipper

Civic address communities:

 Alaska
 Carleton
 Enmore
 Inverness
 Mount Pleasant
 North Enmore
 Portage
 Roxbury
 West Devon

References

10
Geography of Prince County, Prince Edward Island